Folium ("leaf") may refer to

 a leaf of a book: see recto and verso
 Folium of Descartes, an algebraic curve
 Folium (spider), a marking on the abdomen of a spider

Brain anatomy
 Folium (brain)
 Folium vermis

Botany
 Turnsole or folium, a dyestuff
 Folium Phyllostachydis, processed leaves of bamboo
 Hydrangeae Dulcis Folium, processed leaves of hydrangea